Franck Renier (born 11 April 1974 in Laval, Mayenne) is a French former professional road bicycle racer.

Major results

1999
 5th Tro-Bro Léon
2000
 4th Tro-Bro Léon
2001
 1st Tour du Finistère
 5th A Travers le Morbihan
 8th Scheldeprijs
 9th Tro-Bro Léon
2002
 4th Tro-Bro Léon
 7th Overall Paris–Corrèze
2003
 2nd Grand Prix d'Isbergues
 4th Paris–Brussels
 5th Paris–Tours
 5th Paris–Camembert
 9th Grand Prix d'Ouverture La Marseillaise
 10th Grand Prix de Villers-Cotterêts
2004
 3rd Overall Tour du Limousin
 4th Overall Tour de l'Ain
 4th Grand Prix de Villers-Cotterêts
 8th Classic Haribo
 9th Polynormande
 10th Tro-Bro Léon
2006
 8th Omloop Het Volk

Grand Tour results
 Vuelta a España - 121st (2006)
 Giro d'Italia - 134th (2005)
 Tour de France
 85th (2002)
 95th (2003)
 114th (2004)
 116th (2001)

External links
Profile at Bouygues Télécom official website

1974 births
Living people
People from Laval, Mayenne
French male cyclists
Sportspeople from Mayenne
Cyclists from Pays de la Loire